Košarkaški klub ženski Crvena zvezda, commonly referred to as KKŽ Crvena zvezda or simply Crvena zvezda, is a women's professional basketball club based in Belgrade, Serbia and the major part of the Red Star multi-sports club. Crvena zvezda competes in the EuroCup Women and in the Basketball League of Serbia.

The Crvena zvezda squads have won a record 33 National League championships, including 15-in-a-row and 6-in-a-row sequences. They have played three different National Leagues since 1945, including Yugoslav Women's Basketball League (1945–1992), First Women's Basketball League of Serbia and Montenegro (1992–2006) and Serbian League (2006 onwards). They have also won a record 14 National Cup titles and one EuroLeague Women Championship.

Some of the club's star players over the years have included: Cmiljka Kalušević, Snežana Zorić, Vukica Mitić, Zorica Ðurković, Jasmina Milosavljević, Sofija Pekić, Anđelija Arbutina and Ana Joković.

History
Red Star was the major powerhouse in the early stages of the Yugoslav Championship, winning 15 championships in a row between 1945 and 1960. In 1958, it was the first team to represent Yugoslavia in the newly founded European Cup, reaching the tournament's semifinals.

The team wasn't able to win the national championship between 1964 and 1972, but it emerged in the second half of the 1970s winning six national titles in a row. In 1979, it achieved its greatest success by winning the European Cup beating BSE Budapest in the final by 97-62. As of 2021, this remains the highest scoring in a European Cup / Euroleague final. Red Star was the first of only two teams from Yugoslavia to win the competition.

Red Star again reached the European Cup final in 1981, losing this time to Daugava Riga. The following years were less successful, and the team had to wait until 1990 to return to the competition, marking its seventh appearance in the semi-finals.

During the Yugoslav Wars, Red Star was disqualified from the 1992–93 European Champions Cup in accordance with the UNSC Resolution 757. The team returned to European competition in 1996 through the second tier Ronchetti Cup. It has since appeared in the Ronchetti Cup and its successor the Eurocup in 1997, 2000, 2003, 2004, 2009, 2022 and 2023, with modest results.

Sponsorship naming 
Crvena zvezda has had several denominations through the years due to its sponsorship:

Arena

Supporters

Honours

Total titles: 48

Other international achievements
 EuroLeague Women:
 Runners-up (1): 1980–81
 Third place (1): 1989–90
 Semi-finals (5): 1958–59, 1959–60, 1963–64, 1977–78, 1979–80
 Ronchetti Cup:
 Semi-finals (2): 1972–73, 1974–75
 Adriatic League:
 Runners-up (1): 2013–14
 Semi-finals (2): 2017–18, 2018–19

Players

Current roster

Honored numbers

Coaches

  Nebojša Popović (1946–1952)
  Milorad Sokolović (1952–1957)
  Strahinja Alagić (1957–1960)
  Dragan Godžić (1961)
  Dimitrije Krstić (1962–1964)
  Milan Vasojević (1965–1966)
  Sreten Dragojlović (1967–1971)
  Dragoljub Pljakić (1971–1974)
  Strahinja Alagić (1974–1981)
  Zoran Kovačić (1981–1988)
  Vladislav Lučić (1988–1990)
  Zoran Kovačić (1990–1994)
  Dragomir Bukvić (1994–1995)
  Zoran Tir (1995–1996)
  Stevan Karadžić (1996–1998)
  Srđan Antić (1998–2000)
  Milan Nisić (2000)
  Vladislav Lučić (2000–2004)
  Jovica Antonić (2004)
  Dragomir Bukvić (2005–2006)
  Zoran Višić (2006–2007)
  Dragomir Bukvić (2007–2008)
  Miroslav Kanjevac (2009–2011)
  Jovan Gorec (2011–2012)
  Zoran Kovačić (2012–2013)
  Dragan Vuković (2013–present)

Notable players

  Sonja Mladenović
  Mira Petrović
  Ljubica Otašević
  Aleksandra Dakić–Gec
  Gordana Baraga–Bjegojević
  Cmiljka Kalušević
  Snežana Zorić
  Vukica Mitić
  Zorica Đurković
  Jasmina Milosavljević
  Sofija Pekić
  Natalija Bacanović
  Zagorka Počeković
  Bojana Milošević
  Anđelija Arbutina
  Eleonora Vild
  Gordana Bogojević
  Lara Mandić
  Nina Bjedov
  Katarina Lazić
  Milka Bjelica
  Ana Joković
  Katarina Manić
  Milica Dabović
  Ivanka Matić
  Stojanka Ostojić
  Sonja Vasić
  Aleksandra Crvendakić
  Aleksandra Stanaćev
  Nataša Kovačević
  Aleksandra Katanić
  Snežana Bogićević
  Ivana Katanić
  Maša Janković

References

External links
 Official website
 Fan page at facebook.com
 Profile at eurobasket.com
 Profile on srbijasport.net

 
Crvena zvezda
Women's basketball teams in Serbia
Basketball teams in Belgrade
Basketball teams established in 1945
1945 establishments in Serbia
Women's basketball teams in Yugoslavia